The Gulf Club Champions Cup, is a football league tournament for the Arabian Peninsula clubs. The 1983 edition was known as the Gulf Cooperation Council Club Tournament. Not much is known of the championship except that it was the 2nd edition to be played and that it was won by Saudi Arabian outfit Al-Ettifaq.

 

GCC Champions League
Gulf